Niskayuna High School is a public high school in Niskayuna, New York, United States, and is the only high school operated by the Niskayuna Central School District.

History 
Niskayuna High School opened in 1957 after the Board of Education recommended in 1954 that the district build its own high school. Until then, students attended an area high school of their choice. The 1st graduating class was 1959 with 138 students.  Since then, over 18,000 students have graduated from Niskayuna High School. A large expansion was completed in April 2011.. an ongoing capital project includes a new track, parking lot, new athletic fields, and adding pedestrian paths.

Academics 

Niskayuna High School was named a National Blue Ribbon School of Excellence in 1983.  In 1999, the Wall Street Journal named Niskayuna High School one of the top performing high schools in the country.  In 2003, the Washington Post cited Niskayuna High School as one of the best high schools in the nation.  In 2006, Niskayuna High School was rated as one of "America's Best High Schools" by Newsweek magazine, with an index (total Advanced Placement Exams taken in 2005 divided by total number of graduating seniors) of 1.340.

The Albany Business Review rated Niskayuna High School the top-ranked high school in the entire Capital District in both its 2016 and 2014 Annual Schools Report.  In 2012,
U.S. News & World Report listed Niskayuna High School as the top rated public high school in upstate New York. According to U.S. News & World Reports Best High School Rankings in 2019, Niskayuna High School is ranked as #3 in Albany, NY Metro Area High Schools, #106 in New York State High Schools, and #1,254 in the country.

For the Class of 2005, 94% of all graduating seniors attended college.

Notable alumni

 Colin Angle, co-founder of iRobot
 Vinnie Amico, drummer for the band moe.
 Jeff Blatnick, a wrestler who won a gold medal in the 1984 Summer Olympics and is currently a Distinguished Member of the National Wrestling Hall of Fame and Museum, 2015 UFC Hall of Fame inductee.
 Andy Bloom, an Olympic athlete competing in the shot put.
 Kevin Burns, reality TV producer, Prometheus Entertainment; former professor and studio executive
 Garrett Whitley, outfielder and #13 overall pick in the 2015 MLB Draft by the Tampa Bay Rays
 Brian Chesky, Co-founder, CEO Airbnb.com
 Ben Coccio, co-writer of the script for the film The Place Beyond the Pines
 André Davis, wide receiver for the Houston Texans of the NFL
 Kate Fagan, Reporter and TV Personality for ESPN and author
 James Howe, prominent author of children's literature
 Gilbert King, 2013 Pulitzer Prize winner for non-fiction
Dan Harrison, TV Executive at NBC, CBS, UPN, Fox.
 Steve Katz, rock musician; did not graduate from Niskayuna High but did attend (Blues Project, Blood, Sweat & Tears)
 James Read, an actor who starred in North & South with Patrick Swayze.
 Ron Rivest, a cryptographer and MIT Computer Science professor, most famous for helping develop the RSA algorithm
 Joshua Seftel, a filmmaker, primarily of documentaries; nominated for an Oscar for "Stranger at the Gate" in 2023. 
 Kayla Treanor, lacrosse player and head coach for the Syracuse Orange women's lacrosse team
 Huh Yun-jin, singer and member of Le Sserafim

References

 http://www.timesunion.com/news/article/Niskayuna-s-Garrett-Whitley-drafted-in-first-6314874.php
 http://yourniskayuna.com/blog/2015/06/07/boys-lacrosse-niskayuna-wins-1st-state-title/

Public high schools in New York (state)
Schools in Schenectady County, New York